The Lebanon–Syria border is 394 km (245 m) in length and runs from the Mediterranean coast in the north to the tripoint with Israel in the south.

Description
The border starts at confluence of the Nahr al-Kabir river with the Mediterranean Sea, and then follows this river eastwards some distance inland. The border then turns towards the south-west, generally following the Anti-Lebanon Mountains via a series of irregular lines, until reaching Mount Hermon.

The precise location of the Lebanese–Israeli–Syrian tripoint is unclear due to Israel's occupation of the Golan Heights stemming from the 1967 Six-Day War. The de facto tripoints lie on the tripoint(s) with the United Nations UNDOF Zone. The situation is further complicated by the dispute over the Shebaa farms area on the Golan-Lebanon border.

History

At the beginning of the 20th century what are now Lebanon and Syria belonged to the Ottoman Empire, with the Mount Lebanon semi-autonomous as the Mount Lebanon Mutasarrifate. During the First World War an Arab Revolt, supported by Britain, succeeded in removing the Ottomans from most of the Middle East. However as a result of the secret 1916 Anglo-French Sykes-Picot Agreement Britain and France split the Ottoman domains between them, with Syria and Lebanon falling under a French mandate.

In 1920 France split its mandate into several political entities, one of which was an expanded Mount Lebanon Mutasarrifate referred to as 'Greater Lebanon', set up chiefly so as to provide a national polity for the generally pro-French Maronite Christians. The process leading to the precise delineation of the frontier is unclear, though it appears to have been based on a map stemming from the 1860s French expedition to the region which was championed by Lebanese nationalist Bulus Nujaym. Many Syrian nationalists opposed the new entity, seeing Lebanon as an integral part of Greater Syria. The remaining  Syrian states were eventually merged into one Syrian polity in 1930s, minus Lebanon (and also Hatay, which became part of the new Republic of Turkey). Both Lebanon and Syria gained full independence in the period 1943–1946.

Relations between the two new states were often tense, and a precise border has never been fixed officially with any precision, in spite of Lebanese demands to this effect and some preliminary conducted in the 1950–1960s. Many Lebanese feared that its larger neighbour harboured designs to annex the country. In 1975 long-standing sectarian tensions within Lebanon erupted into civil war, prompting Syria to occupy the country the following year; Syrian troops were to remain in Lebanon until 2005. Since 2011, the border region has been seriously affected by the spillover from the Syrian Civil War.

Border crossings
 Arida Border Crossing
 Jusiyah al-Amar-Qaa Border Crossing
 Masnaa Border Crossing, on the road between Damascus and Beirut
 Dabousieh Border Crossing
 Talkalakh Border Crossing
 Zemrani Border Crossing
 Hamra Border Crossing

References

See also
Lebanon–Syria border clashes
Lebanon–Syria relations
Syrian Civil War spillover in Lebanon

 
Borders of Lebanon
Borders of Syria
International borders